Ethne may refer to:

Ethne, alternative spelling for Ethniu
Ethne Kennedy (1921–2005), American religious worker and activist

See also
Ethna